"Dance the Night Away" is a song recorded by South Korean girl group Twice. It was released by JYP Entertainment on July 9, 2018, as the lead single from the group's reissue of their fifth extended play, Summer Nights.

Background and release
Twice's new release was first revealed on June 7, 2018. On June 18, it was officially announced by JYP Entertainment that the group would make a comeback with a new single titled "Dance the Night Away". It is the title track of their album Summer Nights. Both song and the album were released on July 9 on various music portals.

Composition
"Dance the Night Away" was composed by several music producers and has lyrics written by Wheesung. It was described as a "song that offers a fresh tune that suits the summer weather" and was meant to showcase the group's youthfulness. It is a vivacious electronic dance music track with an upbeat tempo.

Tamar Herman from Billboard described the song as a "summery EDM and groovy pop track that bounces around over a beat of thumping bass, bright horns, and blaring synths."

Music video
The music video of "Dance the Night Away" was filmed on an Okinawa beach in early June 2018. Two video teasers were first released on July 1 and 5. The full music video was uploaded online on July 9. It features the nine members of Twice as castaways who wash up on a beach.

Two months after its release, the music video recorded 100 million views on YouTube. It also ranked seventh on the 2018 YouTube Rewind list in the category for the 10 Most Popular Music Videos in South Korea.

Promotion
A few hours after the release of the song, Twice held a live broadcast on Naver V Live to commemorate their comeback, where they also performed the full choreography of the song for the first time. The group also performed "Dance the Night Away" for their comeback stages on Music Bank, Show! Music Core, Inkigayo, Show Champion and M Countdown on July 13, 14, 15, 18 and 19, respectively.

Japanese version
Twice's second compilation album #Twice2, released on March 6, 2019, includes both Korean and Japanese versions of the song. The Japanese lyrics were written by Eri Osanai.

Commercial performance
The song debuted atop Gaon's Digital Chart and Billboard Korea's Kpop Hot 100. It also peaked at No. 2, 5 and 11 on Billboard charts' World Digital Song Sales, Billboard Japan Hot 100 and Oricon Digital Singles, respectively.

In 2019, "Dance the Night Away" surpassed 100 million streams in March and 2,500,000 downloads in September on Gaon Music Chart, earning group's very first Platinum certification's single both streaming and download from the Korea Music Content Association (KMCA) since certification were introduced in April 2018.

Charts

Weekly charts

Year-end charts

Certifications

|-
!scope="col" colspan="3"| Download
|-

|-

Accolades

Award and nominations

Music program awards

See also
 List of certified songs in South Korea
 List of Gaon Digital Chart number ones of 2018
 List of Kpop Hot 100 number ones
 List of M Countdown Chart winners (2018)

References

Twice (group) songs
2018 singles
2018 songs
Korean-language songs
JYP Entertainment singles
Gaon Digital Chart number-one singles
Billboard Korea K-Pop number-one singles
Songs written by Cazzi Opeia